The Glassboro Public Schools are a comprehensive community public school district that serves students in pre-kindergarten through twelfth grade from Glassboro, in Gloucester County, New Jersey, United States.

As of the 2020–21 school year, the district, comprised of five schools, had an enrollment of 1,848 students and 177.7 classroom teachers (on an FTE basis), for a student–teacher ratio of 10.4:1.

The district is classified by the New Jersey Department of Education as being in District Factor Group "B", the second lowest of eight groupings. District Factor Groups organize districts statewide to allow comparison by common socioeconomic characteristics of the local districts. From lowest socioeconomic status to highest, the categories are A, B, CD, DE, FG, GH, I and J.

History
On June 19, 1986, President Ronald Reagan became the first sitting president to speak at a high school graduation when he spoke at the Glassboro High School commencement ceremonies.

Schools
Schools in the district (with 2020–21 enrollment data from the National Center for Education Statistics) are:

Elementary schools
J. Harvey Rodgers School with 199 students in grades PreK and kindergarten
Melanie Sweeney, Principal
Dorothy L. Bullock School with 373 students in grades 1-3
Kelly Marchese, Principal
Thomas E. Bowe Elementary School with 408 students in grades 4-6
Craig Stephenson, Principal
Middle school
Glassboro Intermediate School with 292 students in grades 7-8
LaVonyia Mitchell, Principal
High school
Glassboro High School with 539 students in grades 9-12
Monique Stowman-Burke, Principal
Yuna Park, Assistant Principal - Discipline
Christian Lynch, Assistant Principal - Athletic Director

Administration
Core members of the district's administration are:
Dr. Mark J. Silverstein, Superintendent
Lisa Ridgway, Business Administrator / Board Secretary

Board of education
The district's board of education, with nine members, sets policy and oversees the fiscal and educational operation of the district through its administration. As a Type II school district, the board's trustees are elected directly by voters to serve three-year terms of office on a staggered basis, with three seats up for election each year held (since 2012) as part of the November general election. The board appoints a superintendent to oversee the district's day-to-day operations and a business administrator to supervise the business functions of the district.

References

External links
Glassboro Public Schools
 
School Data for the Glassboro Public Schools, National Center for Education Statistics

Glassboro, New Jersey
New Jersey District Factor Group B
School districts in Gloucester County, New Jersey